Creuse is a département in central France.

Creuse may also refer to:
 Creuse, Somme, a commune of the Somme département, France
 Creuse (river), a river in western France
 La Creuse, a commune in the Haute-Saône department
 Petite Creuse, a river in Allier and Creuse departments, France
 Creuse River (Petite rivière du Chêne), a river in Quebec, Canada

People with the surname
 Auguste de Creuse (1806–1839), French portrait painter

See also
 Creus (disambiguation)